Fantasmas asustados is a 1951 Argentine comedy film directed by Carlos Rinaldi, featuring the Los Cinco Grandes del Buen Humor (Five Greats of Good Humor) group of comic actors. It stars Rafael Carret, Jorge Luz, Zelmar Gueñol, Guillermo Rico and Juan Carlos Cambón. It is noted for its early use (for Argentina) of female impersonation as a comic device.  The film portrays Mexicans as comic characters. Jorge Negrete in particular is satirised.

Cast

  Rafael Carret - Pato
  Jorge Luz - Jorge
  Zelmar Gueñol - Zelmar
  Guillermo Rico - Guille
  Juan Carlos Cambón - Cambón
  Susana Campos - Liliana Elizalde
  Marcelino Ornat - Julio César Andreotti
  Susana Vargas - Sra. Andreotti
  Alberto Barcel - Bruno
  Jorge Villoldo - Antonio
  Eduardo de Labar - Laucha
  Rafael Salvatore - Nene
  Diego Marcote - Police
  José Dorado - Raúl
  César Mariño - Comisario
  Alfonso Pisano
  Carlos Campagnale - Boy camping
  María V. de Blasco - Paralytic
  Carlos Enríquez - Butler

References

External links
 

1951 films
1950s Spanish-language films
Argentine black-and-white films
1951 comedy films
Los Cinco Grandes del Buen Humor films
Argentine comedy films
Films directed by Carlos Rinaldi
1950s Argentine films